Taj Mahal is the debut album by American guitarist and vocalist Taj Mahal. Recorded in 1967, it contains blues songs by Sleepy John Estes, Robert Johnson, and Sonny Boy Williamson II reworked in contemporary blues- and folk-rock styles. Also included is Taj Mahal's adaptation of Blind Willie McTell's "Statesboro Blues", which inspired the popular Allman Brothers Band recording.
 
Taj Mahal, who provides the vocals and blues harmonica, is backed by  guitarists Jesse Ed Davis and Ry Cooder.  Columbia Records released the album in February 1968 to favorable reviews, however, it did not reach the album charts.

Album cover
The Victorian house featured on the cover, known as the Salt Box, was once located on Bunker Hill Avenue in Los Angeles' Bunker Hill neighborhood. Designated a city landmark in 1962, it was one of only two homes that were saved and relocated, only for both be destroyed by an arson-caused fire in 1969 while awaiting restoration at the future site of the Heritage Square Museum. Bunker Hill Avenue no longer exists and the entire 2-block area around the home's original location is now the site of the Wells Fargo Center.

Critical reception

Music critic Bruce Eder gave the album five out of five stars. In his review for AllMusic, Eder described it as "as hard and exciting a mix of old and new blues sounds as surfaced on record… in what had to be one of the most quietly, defiantly iconoclastic records of 1968."

In a music review of Taj Mahal reissues for Entertainment Weekly, Tony Scherman gave the album an "A" and wrote that the album "explodes with high spirits; of Taj’s 30-plus albums, it might be the best."

Track listing
Side 1
 "Leaving Trunk" (Sleepy John Estes) – 4:51 
 "Statesboro Blues" (Blind Willie McTell,  Taj Mahal) – 2:59 
 "Checkin' Up on My Baby" (Sonny Boy Williamson II) – 4:55 
 "Everybody's Got to Change Sometime" (Estes) – 2:57
Side 2
 "EZ Rider" (arr. Taj Mahal) – 3:04 
 "Dust My Broom" (Robert Johnson) – 2:39 
 "Diving Duck Blues" (Estes) – 2:42 
 "The Celebrated Walkin' Blues" (arr. Taj Mahal) – 8:52

Personnel
The personnel listings in the album liner notes are not complete for each track. Taj Mahal provides all of the vocals and harmonica, but the rest of the musicians do not contribute to all tracks.

Musicians
 Taj Mahalvocals, harmonica, slide guitar
 Jesse Ed Davislead guitar, slide guitar
 Ry Cooderrhythm guitar, mandolin
 Bill Boatmanrhythm guitar
 James Thomasbass
 Gary Gilmorebass
 Sanford Konikoffdrums
 Chuck "Brother" Blackwelldrums

Production
Raphael Valentin, Roy Haleeengineer
Ron Corodesign
Guy Websterphotography

References

1968 debut albums
Taj Mahal (musician) albums
Albums produced by Dave Rubinson
Columbia Records albums
Legacy Recordings albums